Ted Kershner (born May 27, 1938) is a former American football player and coach.  He served as the head coach at Glassboro State College (now called Rowan University), an NCAA Division III program in Glassboro, New Jersey. He was the fourth all-time coach for the Profs and compiled a 35–34 record in seven seasons. In 1983, the Profs were New Jersey State Athletic Conference co-champions with Trenton State College. Kershner coached Rowan football for 20 years as an assistant and head coach. He also taught at Rowan.

He attended Ursinus College, from which he graduated in 1960 with a bachelor's degree in physical education. He played quarterback and defensive back for four years at Ursinus. Kershner earned a master's degree from Temple University in 1966.

He currently resides in Woodstown.

Head coaching record

References

1938 births
Living people
Rowan Profs football coaches
Ursinus Bears football players
Rowan University faculty
Temple University alumni